The 2020 season will be DPMM FC's 9th consecutive season  in the top flight of Singaporean football, the Singapore Premier League. Along with the SGPL, the club will also compete in the Singapore Cup. They are the defending champions for the new season.

The club will also enter a domestic team to compete in the 2020 Brunei Super League.

Current club captain and stalwart Wardun Yussof has announced before the start of the campaign that this will be his last season as a professional footballer.

PitchBN will be their new sponsor for 2021.

Squad

Singapore Premier League squad

Brunei Super League squad

Coaching staff

Transfers

Pre-Season transfers

In

Out

Extension / Retained

Trial

Mid-season transfer

In

Out

Friendly

Tour of Cambodia

Team statistics

Appearances and goals

Competitions

Overview

Singapore Premier League

Singapore Cup

See also 
 2017 DPMM FC season
 2018 DPMM FC season
 2019 DPMM FC season

Notes

References 

DPMM FC seasons
DPMM FC